Cingulina isseli is a species of sea snail, a marine gastropod mollusk in the family Pyramidellidae, the pyrams and their allies.

This species was originally described by Issel as Eulimella cingulata, a preoccupied name.

Description
The length of the shell measures 3.5 mm. The white shell is a little shining, translucent, and spirally cingulated. The interstices are longitudinally striated. The teleoconch contains nine whorls, the last with 4 cingulations. The base of the shell is smooth.

Distribution
This species occurs in the following locations:
 European waters (ERMS scope)
 Mersin Bay
 Madagascar
 Mediterranean Sea
 Red Sea
 Persian Gulf

References

 Melvill, J.C., 1911. A revision of the species of the family Pyramidellidae occurring in the Persian Gulf, Gulf of Oman and North Arabian Sea, as exemplified mostly in the collections made by Mr. F.W. Townsend (1893-1900), with descriptions of new species. Proceedings of the Malacological Society of London 9:171-207, pl. 4–6.
 Hornung, A. & Mermod, G., 1924. Mollusques de la Mer Rouge recueillis par A. Issel faisant partie des collections du Musee Civique d'Histoire Naturelle de Genes. Premiere partie, Pyramidellidés. Annali del Museo Civico di Storia Naturale di Genova 51:283-311
 Odé, H. (1998). Indo-Pacific taxa of turbonilids, excluding those along the Americas. Texas Conchologist. 34 (2): 33-103

External links
 To Biodiversity Heritage Library (2 publications)
 To CLEMAM
 To Encyclopedia of Life
 To World Register of Marine Species
 

Pyramidellidae
Gastropods described in 1886